Im Ji-kyu (born March 7, 1978) is a South Korean actor. He is best known for his leading roles in the indie films Who's That Knocking at My Door?, Milky Way Liberation Front, and Magic. Im also played supporting roles in the television romantic comedies Queen of Reversals and The Greatest Love.

Personal life
Im Ji-kyu married Park Ye-son, his girlfriend of four years, in a small private wedding in Seoul on May 17, 2014.  He met his wife, a lawyer, at church.

Filmography

Film

Television series

Web series

Awards and nominations

References

External links

Im Ji-kyu at Naver

South Korean male film actors
South Korean male television actors
1978 births
Living people
People from Busan
21st-century South Korean male actors